Leonard Barnett Davis (born September 5, 1978) is an American former college and professional football player who was an offensive lineman for twelve seasons in the National Football League (NFL).  He played college football for the University of Texas, and was recognized as a consensus All-American.  Davis was drafted by the Arizona Cardinals with the second pick overall of the 2001 NFL Draft, and also played professionally for the Dallas Cowboys, Detroit Lions and San Francisco 49ers of the NFL.

Early years
Leonard grew up in Wortham, Texas.  He is the only child of L.A. and Sammie Lee Davis, but has 21 half-brothers and half-sisters (L.A. had 11 children from a previous marriage, while Sammie Lee had 10 children from a previous marriage).

He attended Wortham High School, where he led his Bulldogs basketball team to the state championship in 1997. In football, he received All-American honors playing defense and offense for a school with fewer than 150 students. He also lettered in track.

College career
Davis received an athletic scholarship to attend the University of Texas at Austin, arriving in John Mackovic's final season, with the intention of playing at defensive tackle and even starting three games. He was moved to the offensive line after Mack Brown was named the new head coach. He played left tackle in his last two years.

During his career, he blocked for Heisman Trophy winner Ricky Williams and Hodges Mitchell. Following his senior season in 2000, he was a first-team All-Big 12 selection, and was recognized as a consensus first-team All-American.  He was also a finalist for the Outland Trophy on two occasions.

Professional career

Arizona Cardinals
Davis was selected second overall in the 2001 NFL Draft by the Arizona Cardinals, and was named the starter at right guard as a rookie. The next year injuries on the offensive line forced the team to move him to right tackle. He was moved back to guard in 2003.

In 2004, after Dennis Green was named the new head coach, he was moved to left tackle where he would remain for three seasons, even though he struggled at the position and was one of the highest penalized players in the league.

On February 17, 2007, the Cardinals told Davis that they would not name him a franchise or transition player, clearing him to become an unrestricted free agent.

Dallas Cowboys
On March 4, 2007, Davis signed with the Dallas Cowboys for a seven-year, $49.6 million contract with $18.75 million guaranteed, who were looking to replace the retired Marco Rivera. At the time, the contract was criticized in the media, for the amount of salary cap space being assigned to a player that would play guard and that had an average performance in previous years. According to Forbes, Davis was the highest-paid NFL player and 19th overall athlete in the 12-month period ending in June 2007, earning $25.4 million.

He was named the starter at right guard and would flourish in Dallas by going to the Pro Bowl in his first three seasons. He had an exceptional year in 2007, as he received Pro Bowl and All-Pro honors for the first time in his career. The Cowboys finished 13-3 and won the NFC East division, but suffered a disappointing first round playoff loss against the New York Giants (who would go on to win the Super Bowl).

In 2009, the Cowboys again won the division and also their first playoff game in 13 seasons.

He was released on July 28, 2011, due to declining play and the team's lack of salary cap room.

Detroit Lions
On November 7, 2011, he signed a one-year deal with the Detroit Lions. After joining the team midway through the season, he was declared inactive for every game with the Lions.

San Francisco 49ers
On July 26, 2012, Davis signed a one-year deal with the San Francisco 49ers as a free agent. He was a backup and was a part of the team that reached Super Bowl XLVII. In the game, he contributed on special teams, but the 49ers fell to the Baltimore Ravens by a score of 34–31.

Personal life
Davis is the bassist in the heavy metal band Free Reign with former Cowboys' teammates Marc Colombo and Cory Procter with guitarist Justin Chapman.

His older half-brother Charlie Davis played defensive tackle in the NFL and the USFL.

Davis now coaches at Chandler High school (Arizona)

See also
List of Texas Longhorns football All-Americans
List of Arizona Cardinals first-round draft picks

References

External links
 Detroit Lions bio
 Texas Longhorns football bio

1978 births
Living people
All-American college football players
American football offensive guards
American football offensive tackles
Arizona Cardinals players
Dallas Cowboys players
Detroit Lions players
National Conference Pro Bowl players
San Francisco 49ers players
Texas Longhorns football players